Benjamin Mason may refer to:

Mason family
Benjamin Mason (born 1992) of the Mason family of politicians
Benjamin Mason (1826–1847) of the Mason family of politicians
Benjamin Mason (born 1865) of the Mason family of politicians

Others
Benjamin Franklin Mason, American artist
Benjamin Mason (MP) (fl.1656), MP for Herefordshire

See also
Ben Mason (disambiguation)